is a Japanese manga series based on Ryohgo Narita's light novel series of the same name, illustrated by Akiyo Satorigi (first three arcs) and Aogiri (fourth arc). It has been serialized in Square Enix's shōnen manga magazine Monthly GFantasy since June 2009.

Publication

The Durarara!! manga, adaptation of Ryohgo Narita's light novel series of the same name, has been serialized in Square Enix's shōnen manga magazine Monthly GFantasy. Its first three arcs were illustrated by Akiyo Satorigi and the fourth arc is illustrated by Aogiri. The series' first arc ran from June 18, 2009, to April 18, 2011.

Square Enix has collected the chapters into individual tankōbon volumes; the first arc has four volumes, released from December 26, 2009, to June 27, 2011; the second arc has three volumes, released from February 27, 2012, to March 27, 2013; the third arc has three volumes, released from October 26, 2013, to January 27, 2015. The fourth arc has currently seven volumes, with the first released on July 10, 2015, and the seventh on June 25, 2021.

In North America, the manga is licensed for English release by Yen Press; the first arc release was announced in July 2011; the second arc release was announced in August 2012, the third arc was announced in 2014; the fourth arc was announced in October 2015.

Reception
Reviewing the first volume, Carlo Santos of Anime News Network praised the manga for its characters, the shift between different genres, ranging from "a slice-of-life school tale, an action-packed crime thriller, or even a psychological mind-bender", and the "stylish, sharp-lined artwork", but criticized it for its "lack of storytelling discipline", which could make the reader wondering what the series is focusing on. Santos concluded: "The story may be unbalanced so far with so many characters and subplots, but getting aboard that ride is part of the fun! This highly original, stylish work is definitely A− material". 

Chris Kirby of The Fandom Post, in his review of the first volume, wrote that in contrast to the anime adaptation of Durarara!!, in the manga is easier for the reader to follow the events and characters, as the readers control the pace, making it more enjoyable. Kirby concluded: "As far as introductory volumes go, Durarara is top notch and I for one am excited to see how subsequent volumes play out once a plot starts forming". 
 
Danica Davidson of Otaku USA, reviewing the first volume, wrote: "There’s definitely a lot of mystery going on in this first volume, and it’s written so that it’s unclear how all these characters will come together. The story is a little challenging at first, but Durarara!! has a number of good things going for it".

David Gromer of Graphic Novel Reporter said: "If you are a fan of seemingly nothing-out-of-the-ordinary book series that become increasingly out-of-the-ordinary, Durarara!! is something you should definitely consider picking up".

References

External links
 
 

Action anime and manga
Fiction about urban legends
Gangan Comics manga
Gangs in fiction
Mythology in anime and manga
Shōnen manga
Suspense anime and manga
Tokyo in fiction
Urban fantasy anime and manga
Yakuza in anime and manga
Yen Press titles